The Catholic Church in the North Macedonia has no national episcopal conference, given its one bishop (for one Latin diocese and one Eastern Catholic diocese), which participates in the International Episcopal Conference of Saints Cyril and Methodius (as do Balkanic neighbours Kosovo, Montenegro and Serbia, all also former Yugoslavian constituent republics).

There formally is an Apostolic Nunciature as papal diplomatic representation (embassy-level) to Macedonia, but it's vested in the Apostolic Nunciature to Bulgaria in its capital Sofia

Current jurisdictions

Latin see 
 Roman Catholic Diocese of Skopje, suffragan of the Bosnian Roman Catholic Archdiocese of Sarajevo (Vrhbosna)

Eastern Catholic see 
Byzantine Rite
 Macedonian Catholic Eparchy of the Assumption of the Blessed Virgin Mary in Strumica-Skopje, diocese (directly subject to the Holy See and its Roman Congregation for the Oriental Churches) and so far vested in the Latin bishopric of Skopje, yet constitutes the only jurisdiction of the Macedonian Catholic (rite- & language-specific) particular church sui iuris

Defunct jurisdictions 
Excluding direct predecessors of current sees above

Titular see 
One Metropolitan Titular archbishopric :
 Oc(h)rid(a) = Acrida

Defunct Eastern Catholic jurisdictions 
Byzantine Rite
 Bulgarian Catholic Apostolic Vicariate of Macedonia (also in Greece)

See also 
 List of Catholic dioceses (structured view)

Sources and external links 
 GCatholic - data for all sections

Macedonia